Acmopyle is a genus of conifers belonging to the podocarp family, Podocarpaceae. The genus includes two species of evergreen small to tall well-branched trees and large trees. Acmopyle is limited to two species, A. pancheri, endemic to New Caledonia, and A. sahniana, endemic to Fiji, but has a fossil record in Australia.

Species

References
 Hill, R.S. and Carpenter, R. 1991. Evolution of Acmopyle and Dacrycarpus (Podocarpaceae) foliage as inferred from macrofossils in south-eastern Australia. Australian Systematic Botany, 4: 449-79.
 de Laubenfels, David J. 1972. No. 4, Gymnospermes, in A. Aubréville and Jean-F. Leroy, eds., Flore de la Nouvelle-Calédonie et Dépendances. Paris: Muséum National d'Histoire Naturelle. 
 Pole, M.S., 1997. Miocene conifers from the Manuherikia Group, New Zealand. Journal of the Royal Society of New Zealand, 27: 355-370.
 Vidakovic, Mirko. 1991. Conifers: morphology and variation. Translated from Croatian by Maja Soljan. Croatia: Graficki Zavod Hrvatske.

Podocarpaceae
Podocarpaceae genera